Max is an unincorporated community in Jefferson Township, Boone County, in the U.S. state of Indiana.

History
A post office was established at Max in 1886, and remained in operation until it was discontinued in 1907.

Geography

References

Unincorporated communities in Boone County, Indiana
Unincorporated communities in Indiana
Indianapolis metropolitan area